Victoria Ann Larimore (born October 5, 1956) is an American film director, television director, producer, screenwriter, and playwright. She received an Emmy nomination for her 1992 work, "Saying Kaddish." She has also produced:The Amish: Not to Be Modern (1985), An Empty Bed (1990), Saying Kaddish (1992), and the film noir thriller, Room 32 (2002).

Career
Larimore co-wrote a screenplay adaptation of Toni Morrison's The Bluest Eye with her then husband Michael Taylor. She went on to produce and direct the Emmy nominated Saying Kaddish (1991), An Empty Bed (1990), Room 32 (2002), and has worked as a script and creative consultant on projects including the psychological thriller, 40 Sundays, directed by Geoffrey de Valois.

Larimore received the “Best Director, Comedy” award for Sawed in Half from the Noho Fringe Festival.
The play, which she co-wrote with Andrea Mezvinsky who was crowned “America’s Funniest Mom” on The Oprah Winfrey Show, received positive reviews and premiered at the Complex Theatre in Hollywood in May 2016.
It enjoyed a revival at the Acme Theatre, Noho, the following September.

Personal life

She divorced from Michael Taylor in 1991.

Filmography

Films

 Slumber Party, 1983 (writer/director/producer) - selected for viewing at the New York City Anthology Film Archives
 Gloria: A Case of Alleged Police Brutality, 1985 (writer) - dir. by Oren Rudavsky
 The Amish: Not to Be Modern, 1985 (director/producer)
 Bird/Bear, 1986 (co-director)
 An Empty Bed, 1990 (producer)
 Saying Kaddish, 1991 (producer) - Emmy Award nominee for Outstanding Achievement in Directing
 Pair of Jokers, 1992 (producer)
 Room 32, 2002 (director)

Television

 Alive from Off Center, 1989 (1 episode, writer), Ile Aiye/The House of Life
 Looking East, 1991 (2 episodes, writer/director/producer)
 The Hidden Realm, 2003 (writer/director/producer)
 Yue-Sai's World, 2006 (1 episode, writer/director/producer) 
 Outlaugh!, 2006 (director)
 The Mage, 2015 (creator)

Larimore has also worked in theater, and served as "Director in Residence" at the GuerrilLA Theatre in Los Angeles, as well as premiering her self-directed play, Angel Dog, at The Producer's Club in Manhattan in 2010.

References

External links
 
 http://www.nycastings.com/dmxreadyv2/blogmanager/v3_blogmanager.asp?post=cs

1956 births
Living people
People from Lorain, Ohio
Film directors from Ohio
Washington University in St. Louis alumni